Theyyam (/t̪eːjjəm/; romanised: teyyam) are  Hindu ritualistic dance forms practiced in northern Kerala and some parts of Karnataka. Theyyam is also known as Kaḷiyāṭṭaṁ or Tiṟa. Theyyam consists of traditions, rituals and customs associated with temples and sacred groves of Malabar. The people of the region consider Theyyam itself as a channel to a god and they thus seek blessings from Theyyam.

In Kasaragod and Kannur districts, this ritual art is mainly performed in the kavus (temples) or ancestral houses of Nambiar, Thiyyar, Vaniyar and Maniyani communities.

Theyyam is typically performed by people from castes and tribes like Pulayar, Vannan, Malayan, Anhoottan, Munnoottan, Mavilan, Koppalan, Velan, Chingathan, Kalanaadi, Paravan, Nalikeyavar etc. Of these Kalanaadi people perform only in Wayanad district, while Parava, Pampatha, Nalikeyavar perform in places north of Kerala like Udupi, Krishnapuram etc. 

There are about 456 types of Theyyams documented. Theyyam is mainly performed by males, except the Devakoothu theyyam; the Devakoothu is the only Theyyam ritual performed by women. Devakoothu is performed only in the Thekkumbad Kulom temple.

In Kerala, Theyyam is performed predominantly in the North Malabar region (consisting of present-day Kasargod, Kannur Districts, Mananthavady Taluk of Wayanad and Vadakara and Koyilandy Taluks of Kozhikode). A similar custom is followed in the Tulunadu region of neighbouring Karnataka known as Bhuta Kola.

Theyyam season starts from the tenth day of the Malayalam month of Thulam (usually falls during October, and known as paththaam-udayam) and lasts up to seven months till the middle of Edavam month (typically around May end, June). The last Kaliyaattam  for the season is performed at Madayi Kavu and Kalarivathukkal Bhagavathy Temple, Both being the family shrines of Kolathiri royal family.

History

Theyyam has a long history.  "There can be no doubt", say Bridget and Raymond Alchin, "that a very large part of this modern folk religion is extremely ancient and contains traits which originated during the earliest periods of Neolithic, Chalcolithic settlement and expression."

There are approximately 400 types of Theyyam, including Vettakkorumakan, Kathivanoor Veeran, Vishnumoorthy Theyyam, Muchilot Bhagavathi and Sree Muthappan.

Classification of sub-cults

According to K. K. N. Kurup, it can be said that all the prominent characteristics of primitive, tribal, religious worship had widened the stream of Theyyam, where "even the followers of Islam are associated with the cult in its functional aspect" and made it a deep-rooted folk religion of millions. For instance, Bhagavathi, the mother goddesses had and still have an important place in Theyyam. Besides this, the practices like spirit-worship, ancestor-worship, hero-worship, masathi-worship, tree-worship, animal worship, serpent-worship, the worship of the goddesses of disease and the worship of Gramadevata (Village-Deity) are included in the mainstream of the Theyyam. Along with these gods and goddesses there exist innumerable folk gods and goddesses. Most of these goddesses are known as Bhagavathy.

Different branches of mainstream Hindu religion such as Shaktism, Vaishnavism and Shaivism now dominate Theyyam. However, the forms of propitiation and other rituals are continuations of a very ancient tradition. In several cult-centres, blood offering is seen, which is forbidden in Buddhism and Jainism. In such centres, separate places outside the precincts of the shrine are selected for blood offerings and for the preparation of the traditional Kalam (Square made for this sacrifice occasion) known as Vadakkan Vathil. The Theyyam deities propitiated through cock-sacrifice will not enter such shrines. This religious cockfight over blood sacrifice, which does also include the cockfight as a blood sacrifice, is a prime example of "cultural synthesis of 'little' and 'great' cultures".

On account of the supposedly late revival of the Vaishnavism movement in Kerala, it does not have a deep impact on Theyyam . Only a few deities are available under this category. Two major Theyyam deities of Vaishnavism are Vishnumoorthi and Daivathar. Vaishnavism was very popular in the Tuluva region in the 13th century when it came under the rule of Vishnuvardhana of the Hoysala dynasty. He was a great champion of Vaishnavism. Most probably he was initially deified as Vishnumoorthi and incorporated into the Bhoota cult of the Tuluvas and then further incorporated as a prominent folk deity into the Theyyam as well. To some, the legend of Vishnumoorthi is symbolizes the god's migration from Mangalore to Kolathunadu.

All other categories of Theyyam deities can be classified under Shaivism or Shaktism. Even spirits, ancestors, heroes, and animals are deified and included in those categories. Briefly, Theyyam provides a good example for the religious evolution of, and the subsequent different stages in modern Hinduism, with the overall understanding that within Hindu syncretism lay propitiation as ancient practices and rituals of ancient worship intended for the blessings of the supernatural not unlike, "in Indus Valley and other ancient civilizations, mother goddess had been invoked for fertility and prosperity".

Patronage
Out of devotion, ruling clans established their own shrines and Kavus for Theyyam deities where non-sattvic rituals and customs are observed. The goddesses like Rakteshwari, Chamundi, Someshwari, Kurathi, and the gods like Vishnumoorthi are propitiated in these household shrines. There, the Theyyam dancers appear during the annual festivals of gods and goddesses. The rituals in such shrines are different from those of the Brahmanical temples. The impact of this cultural fusion could be traced to the social organisation based on the caste system and in the agrarian relations. The inviting of Brahmin Thanthri to consecrate the idols of Kavu is a recent development.

Ritual performance

The dance or invocation is generally performed in front of the village shrine. It is also performed in the houses as ancestor-worship with elaborate rites and rituals.

There is no stage or curtain or other such arrangements for the performance. The devotees would be standing or some of them would be sitting on a sacred tree in front of the shrine. In short, it is an open theatre. Performance of a particular deity according to its significance and hierarchy in the shrine continues for 12 to 24 hours with intervals. The chief dancer who propitiates the central deity of the shrine has to reside in the rituals. Further, after the sun sets, this particular dancer would not eat anything for the remainder of that day. His make-up is done by specialists and other dancers. The first part of the performance is usually known as Vellattam or Thottam. It is performed without proper make-up or any decorative costume. Only a small, red headdress is worn on this occasion.

The dancer along with the drummers recites the particular ritual song, which describes the myths and legends, of the deity of the shrine or the folk deity to be propitiated. This is accompanied by the playing of folk musical instruments. After finishing this primary ritualistic part of the invocation, the dancer returns to the green room. Again after a short interval, he appears with proper make-up and costumes. There are different patterns of face painting. Some of these patterns are called vairadelam, kattaram, kozhipuspam, kottumpurikam, and prakkezhuthu. Mostly primary and secondary colours are applied with contrast for face painting. It helps in effecting certain stylization in the dances. Then the dancer comes in front of the shrine and gradually "metamorphoses" into the particular deity of the shrine. The performance signifies the transitional inversion, reversal, and elevation of status denoting the anti-structural homogeneity of Theyyam. He, after observation of certain rituals places the head-dress on his head and starts dancing. In the background, folk musical instruments like chenda, tudi, kuzhal and veekni are played in a certain rhythm. All the dancers take a shield and kadthala (sword) in their hands as continuation of the weapons. Then the dancer circumambulates the shrine, runs in the courtyard and continues dancing there. The Theyyam dance has different steps known as Kalaasams. Each Kalasam is repeated systematically from the first to the eighth step of footwork. A performance is a combination of playing of musical instruments, vocal recitations, dance, and peculiar makeup (usually predominantly orange) and costumes. The Kathivanoor Veeran Theyyam is one of the famous theyyam in Kerala

Types of Theyyams
There are about 456 types of Theyyam (theyyakkolams), among which 112 are famous. Some of the famous Theyyams are:

Muchilot Bhagavathi
Muchilot Bhagavathi is a virgin goddess and the tutelary deity of the Vaniyas of North Malabar.According to local legend she was a Brahmin woman born in the mana called Maniyottu in the village of Peringellur, near Taliparambaand elevated to the status of a deity but according to the holy manuscript(Pattola) Muchilot Bhagavathi is the kaliyuga avatar of Sita devi of treta yuga , Maya Devi of Dwarapa era and Gaiyatri Devi who appeared before Viswamitra Maharishi.While travelling in the earth she rested at the home of Muchilot pada nair, who was a soldier belonging to Muchilot clan among vāṇiyas.

Kathivanur Veeran

The Kathivanur Veeran theyyam is performed in the memory of the great Thiyya community warrior Mandhappan Chekavar.

Vishnumoorthi

It is the most popular Vaishnava Theyyam. This theyyam narrates and performs the story of Hiranyakashipu's death by the Lord Vishnu in his avatar of Narasimham. Because of this, Vishnumoorthi has another name, 'Narasimha Moorthi' [half man and half lion avtar of Vishnu].

Sree Muthappan Theyyam

Muthappan theyyam consists of two divine figures is considered as the personification of two divine figures— the Thiruvappana or Valiya Muttapan (Vishnu) and the Vellatom or Cheriya Muttapan (Shiva). Muthappan Theyyam is different from other theyyams as it is performed all around the year. Muthappan Anthithira is another theyyam dedicated to Muthapan. The uniqueness of it is that it is performed only once in all the Muthapan temples.

Padikutti Amma
The Padikuttiyamma is believed to be the mother of Muthapan. The Padikutti Amma Theyyam is performed in the Palaprath Temple in Kodallur near Parassini Kadavu in the Meenam (a Malayalam month).

Gulikan
Gulikan represents Yama, the Hindu god of death. The Benkanakavu (Venganakavu) in Nileshwar is the most famous temple dedicated to Gulikan.

Padamadakki Bhagavathy
It is performed in the Koroth Temple. The legend behind the Padamadakki Bhagavathy theyyam is that the Nileswarr Raja prayed to the goddess for help from the invading army from Karnataka and Devi sent Padamadakki Bhagavathy for help. Upon seeing the Padamadakki Bhagavathy, the attacking army became unconscious and thus the war was averted.

Manakkott Amma
Manakkott Amma Theyyam is performed in the Vairajathan Temple in Nileshwar. The Manakott was a woman born in a Nair family. She opposed the caste system that existed at that time. When she broke a caste rule, she was killed by the head of the family. She was pregnant at that time. Her murder caused a lot of problems in their family and was finally destroyed. Later she emerged as a goddess.

Kuttichathan

Kuttichathan is a famous theyyam. The theyyam is associated with the Brahmin Family of Kalakatt Illam situated in Payyannur. It is believed that Kalakattachan, angry on him being a threat to his respect in the society, tore Kuttichathan into 396 pieces. There emerged 396 Chathans from the torn pieces and set the Namboothiri's house to fire, and burnt nearby Brahmin houses. This is the myth behind Kuttichathan.

Chamundi
Chamundi theyyam is majorly of three types, namely Madayil Chamundi, Rakta Chamundi, and Kundorra Chamundi.

Madayil Chamundi
Chamundi is the same Kali who killed the Chandamundans and got up and drank the blood of the Raktabijasura without falling to the ground. Chamundi is also known as 'Rakta Chamundi' and 'Rakteshwari' because she is immersed in blood. It is said that in the battle with the savages, Kali followed them to the underworld and fought. It is called 'Pathalamoorthy' and 'Madayil Chamundi' because she went to the underworld.

Known as Kundora Chamundi, Kundadi Chamundi and Kundoor Chamundi, this goddess is the image of Kali who killed Darikasura. This theyyam is built by Velanmar.

Puthiyaramban Daivam
“Puthiyaramban was the lead fighter of allada swaroopam”. It is believed that Puthiyaramban was having supernatural power. As a leading warrior he has deep knowledge and skill in Kalari (martial art).After his great victory, He was betrayed in nanummel kali (kalari). Believed that he became god after his death. Puthiyaramban Theyyam is performed in Puthiyaramban Tharavadu, Sree Kappattu Kazhagam, Sree Kannamangalam Kazhagam and Udinoor kulom.

Recent development

A Theyyam museum is proposed to be built at Chanthappura in Kalliassery assembly constituency of Kannur district in 2019.

See also
Kathivanoor Veeran
Temples of Kerala
Uttama Villain
Padayani
Neeliyar Bhagavathi
Thirayattam
Thiyyar history

References

Further reading
 Mathew, Raisun & Pandya, Digvijay. "Carnivalesque, Liminality and Social Drama:  Characterising the Anti-Structural Potential of Theyyam." Rupkatha Journal on Interdisciplinary Studies in Humanities, vol. 13, no. 3, 2021, pp. 1-11, DOI: https://dx.doi.org/10.21659/rupkatha.v13n3.28
 .
 .
 
 
 Nambiar, Balan (1981). "Gods and Ghosts – Theyyam and Bhuta rituals". Doshi, Saryu (ed) The performing Arts, Marg Volume 34, Issues 3–4, Bombay, 1981, pp 62–73
 
 Kerala Sangeetha Nataka Akademi (ed) THEYYAM (a symposium), Lumiere Printing Works, Trichur, 1978
  New Delhi has a collection of 1800 slides with research notes by Balan Nambiar

External links

: A complete theyyam website | Theyyam in Malabar
 , including images.
A Journey through theyyams on Youtube

 
Dances of Kerala
Ritual dances
Arts of Kerala
Hinduism in Kerala